Orange is the fourth studio album by Al Stewart, originally released in 1972, and re-released in 1996 and 2007 on CD. Generally regarded as a 'transitional album' between the confessional folk sounds of his first three albums and the historically themed albums of his more successful mid-1970s period, the album includes Rick Wakeman on piano as well as future Elvis Costello and the Attractions bassist Bruce Thomas. The album also included one of the very few cover versions recorded by Stewart, Bob Dylan's "I Don't Believe You".

Track listing
All tracks composed by Al Stewart except where noted.

Original LP release
"You Don't Even Know Me" – 4:00
"Amsterdam" – 2:56
"Songs Out of Clay" – 4:16
"The News from Spain" – 6:34
"I Don't Believe You" (Bob Dylan) – 3:38
"Once an Orange, Always an Orange" – 4:18
"I'm Falling" – 4:28
"Night of the 4th of May" – 6:27

2007 Collector's Choice Music bonus tracks
 "Soho" – 3:57
 "Elvaston Place" – 2:52
 "It Doesn't Matter Anymore" (Paul Anka) – 2:25

Personnel
Al Stewart – vocals, acoustic guitar
Tim Renwick – electric guitar (all tracks), Spanish guitar (3)
Cal Batchelor – Spanish guitar (3)
Timothy Walker – Spanish guitar (4)
Brinsley Schwarz – 12-string acoustic guitar
Bruce Thomas, Brian Odgers – bass
Rick Wakeman – piano, organ
Bob Andrews – organ (8)
Graham Hunt, Roger Pope, John Willie Wilson – drums
John Donelly, Kevin Powers, Mick Welton – backing vocals (2)

Technical
David Hentschel – engineer
Keith "Keef" MacMillan - photography

References

1972 albums
Al Stewart albums
CBS Records albums
Collectors' Choice Music albums
Albums produced by John Anthony (record producer)
Albums recorded at Trident Studios